Vladimir Nikitovich Yerokhin (Russian: Владимир Никитович Ерохин,  Ukrainian: Володимир Микитович Єрохін, 10 April 1930 – 6 October 1996) was an association footballer from the former Soviet Union who played for FC Dynamo Kyiv. He was born in Moscow, and was a member of the USSR's squad for the 1958 FIFA World Cup, but did not win any caps.

Yerokhin began his club football career with FC Dynamo Kyiv where he would spend nine seasons in the Soviet Top League and win the 1961 championship, before finishing his career with FC Avanhard Ternopil in the Soviet Second League.

In 1956 Yerokhin played a couple of games for Ukraine at the Spartakiad of the Peoples of the USSR. He died in Kyiv, aged 66.

References

1930 births
1996 deaths
Footballers from Moscow
Soviet footballers
FC Dynamo Kyiv players
FC Avanhard Ternopil players
1958 FIFA World Cup players
Association football defenders